Kalateh-ye Som (also Romanized as Kalāteh-ye S̄om and Kalāteh-ye Sam) is a village in Bala Rokh Rural District, Jolgeh Rokh District, Torbat-e Heydarieh County, Razavi Khorasan Province, Iran. At the 2006 census, its population was 245, in 74 families.

References 

Populated places in Torbat-e Heydarieh County